Walter Paul Khotso Makhulu  (born Johannesburg 1935) is an emeritus South African-born Anglican archbishop of Central Africa.
  
Makhulu was educated at St Peter's Theological College, Rosettenville and Selly Oak College, Birmingham. He was ordained deacon in 1957 and priest in 1958. He was a curate at St. Michael and All Angels church, Poplar, London from 1964 until 1966; and at St Silas, Pentonville from 1966 until 1968. He was vicar of St Philip's, Battersea from 1968 to 1975; and then secretary of WCC (East Africa) until his ordination to the episcopate.

Makhulu was patron of Ditshwanelo, the Botswana Centre for Human Rights. When it campaigned for LGBT rights in Botswana, some religious leaders were critical, but he commented "Yes the Bible does say it is opposed [to homosexuality]. But it was written in its own day and in its own time".

Honours
In 1981, Makhulu was a recipient of the Ordre des Palmes académiques. He was admitted to the Order of the Companions of O. R. Tambo by the president of South Africa, Cyril Ramaphosa on 25 April 2019. He was an honorary assistant bishop of the Diocese of London until his resignation in March 2023.

Notes

1935 births
Living people
20th-century Anglican archbishops
20th-century Anglican bishops in Africa
Anglican archbishops of Central Africa
Anglican bishops of Botswana
Companions of the Order of St Michael and St George
Clergy from Johannesburg
20th-century South African Anglican priests
Recipients of the Order of the Companions of O. R. Tambo
Recipients of the Ordre des Palmes Académiques